Olivier Delaître and Jeff Tarango were the defending champions but did not compete that year.

Grant Connell and Scott Davis won in the final 7–6, 3–6, 6–3 against Doug Flach and Chris Woodruff.

Seeds
The top four seeded teams received byes into the second round.

Draw

Final

Top half

Bottom half

External links
 1996 Legg Mason Tennis Classic Doubles draw

1996 ATP Tour